Club Atlético Independiente's 2012–13 season is the club's 107th year of existence. Independiente this season going to play the Torneo Inicial, the Torneo Final, the Copa Sudamericana and the Copa Argentina.

Squad

Winter transfers

Summer transfers

Competitions

Avellaneda derby friendlies

Copa Sudamericana

Copa Argentina

Argentine Primera División

Torneo Inicial

Torneo Final

Relegation

Updated as of the start of the tournament.Source:

References

External links
 Club Atlético Independiente official web site 

Ind
Club Atlético Independiente seasons